Jaye Wells is an urban fantasy author. She writes the Sabina Kane series, which is published worldwide by science fiction and fantasy publishers Orbit Books. Before she became a full-time writer, she was a magazine editor and freelance journalist. She lives in Texas with her husband and son.

Bibliography

The Sabina Kane Series
 Red-Headed Stepchild (April 2009)
 The Mage in Black (April 2010)
 Violet Tendencies (April 2011), a short story
 Green-Eyed Demon (February 2011)
 Silver-Tongued Devil (January 2012)
 Blue-Blooded Vamp (June 2012)
 Rusted Veins (October 2013), novella
 Fool's Gold (October 2014), novella

The Prospero's War Series
 Dirty Magic (January 2014)
 Cursed Moon (August 2014)
 Fire Water (January 2015), novella
 Deadly Spells (February 2015)
 Volatile Bonds (September 2017)

The Meridian Six Novella Series
 Meridian Six (December 2013)
 Children of Ash (March 2015)

The Murdoch Vampire Series
 The Hot Scot (as Kate Eden) (December 2013)
 Rebel Child (as Kate Eden) (December 2013)

Short stories
 Werewife (July 2013)
 The Bluest Hour (December 2014)

References

External links

Urban fantasy writers
American women novelists